Belgium competed at the 1984 Summer Paralympics in Stoke Mandeville, Great Britain and New York City, United States. 35 competitors from Belgium won 58 medals including 21 gold, 23 silver and 14 bronze and finished 13th in the medal table.

See also 
 Belgium at the Paralympics
 Belgium at the 1984 Summer Olympics

References 

1984
1984 in Belgian sport
Nations at the 1984 Summer Paralympics